Perfection is a state, variously, of completeness, flawlessness, or supreme excellence.

The term is used to designate a range of diverse, if often kindred, concepts. These have historically been addressed in a number of discrete disciplines, notably mathematics, physics, chemistry, ethics, aesthetics, ontology, and theology.

Term and concept

The form of the word long fluctuated in various languages. The English language had the alternates, "perfection" and the Biblical "perfectness." The word "perfection" derives from the Latin "perfectio", and "perfect" — from "perfectus". These expressions in turn come from "perficio" — "to finish", "to bring to an end". "Perfectio(n)" thus literally means "a finishing", and "perfect(us)" — "finished", much as in grammatical parlance ("perfect").

Many modern languages have adopted their terms for the concept of "perfection" from the Latin: the French "parfait" and "perfection"; the Italian "perfetto" and "perfezione"; the Spanish "perfecto" and "perfección"; the English "perfect" and "perfection"; the Russian "совершенный" (sovyershenniy) and "совершенcтво" (sovyershenstvo); the Croatian and Serbian "savršen" and "savršenstvo"; the Czech "dokonalost"; the Slovak "dokonaly" and "dokonalost"; the Polish "doskonały" and "doskonałość".

The genealogy of the concept of "perfection" reaches back beyond Latin, to Greek. The Greek equivalent of the Latin "perfectus" was "teleos". The latter Greek expression generally had concrete referents, such as a perfect physician or flutist, a perfect comedy or a perfect social system. Hence the Greek "teleiotes" was not yet so fraught with abstract and superlative associations as would be the Latin "perfectio" or the modern "perfection". To avoid the latter associations, the Greek term has generally been translated as "completeness" rather than "perfection".

The oldest definition of "perfection", fairly precise and distinguishing the shades of the concept, goes back to Aristotle. In Book Delta of the Metaphysics, he distinguishes three meanings of the term, or rather three shades of one meaning, but in any case three different concepts. That is perfect:
1. which is complete — which contains all the requisite parts;
2. which is so good that nothing of the kind could be better;
3. which has attained its purpose.

The first of these concepts is fairly well subsumed within the second. Between those two and the third, however, there arises a duality in concept. This duality was expressed by Thomas Aquinas, in the Summa Theologica, when he distinguished a twofold perfection: when a thing is perfect in itself — as he put it, in its substance; and when it perfectly serves its purpose.

The variants on the concept of perfection would have been quite of a piece for two thousand years, had they not been confused with other, kindred concepts. The chief of these was the concept of that which is the best:  in Latin, "excellentia" ("excellence"). In antiquity, "excellentia" and "perfectio" made a pair; thus, for example, dignitaries were called "perfectissime", just as they are now called "excellency."  Nevertheless, these two expression of high regard differ fundamentally: "excellentia" is a distinction among many, and implies comparison; while "perfectio" involves no comparison, and if something is deemed perfect, then it is deemed so in itself, without comparison to other things. Gottfried Wilhelm Leibniz, who thought much about perfection and held the world to be the best of possible worlds, did not claim that it was perfect.

Paradoxes

The parallel existence of two concepts of perfection, one strict ("perfection", as such) and the other loose ("excellence"), has given rise, perhaps since antiquity but certainly since the Renaissance, to a singular paradox: that the greatest perfection is imperfection. This was formulated by Lucilio Vanini (1585–1619), who had a precursor in the 16th-century writer Joseph Juste Scaliger, and they in turn referred to the ancient philosopher Empedocles. Their argument, as given by the first two, was that if the world were perfect, it could not improve and so would lack "true perfection", which depends on progress. To Aristotle, "perfect" meant "complete" ("nothing to add or subtract"). To Empedocles, according to Vanini, perfection depends on incompleteness ("perfectio propter imperfectionem"), since the latter possesses a potential for development and for complementing with new characteristics ("perfectio complementii"). This view relates to the baroque esthetic of Vanini and Marin Mersenne:  the perfection of an art work consists in its forcing the recipient to be active—to complement the art work by an effort of mind and imagination.

The paradox of perfection—that imperfection is perfect—applies not only to human affairs, but to technology. Thus, irregularity in semiconductor crystals (an imperfection, in the form of contaminants) is requisite for the production of semiconductors. The solution to the apparent paradox lies in a distinction between two concepts of "perfection": that of regularity, and that of utility. Imperfection is perfect in technology, in the sense that irregularity is useful.

Perfect numbers
Perfect numbers have been distinguished ever since the ancient Greeks called them "teleioi." There was, however, no consensus among the Greeks as to which numbers were "perfect" or why. A view that was shared by Plato held that 10 was a perfect number. Mathematicians, including the mathematician-philosopher Pythagoreans, proposed as a perfect number, the number 6.

The number 10 was thought perfect because there are 10 fingers to the two hands. The number 6 was believed perfect for being divisible in a special way:  a sixth part of that number constitutes unity; a third is two; a half — three; two-thirds is four; five-sixths (pentamoiron) is five; six is the perfect whole. The ancients also considered 6 a perfect number because the human foot constituted one-sixth the height of a man, hence the number 6 determined the height of the human body.

Thus both numbers, 6 and 10, were credited with perfection, both on purely mathematical grounds and on grounds of their relevance in nature. Belief in the "perfection" of certain numbers survived antiquity, but this quality came to be ascribed to other numbers as well. The perfection of the number 3 actually became proverbial: "omne trinum perfectum". Another number, 7, found a devotee in the 6th-century Pope Gregory I (Gregory the Great), who favored it on grounds similar to those of the Greek mathematicians who had seen 6 as a perfect number, and in addition for some reason he associated the number 7 with the concept of "eternity."

The Middle Ages, however, championed the perfection of 6: Augustine and Alcuin wrote that God had created the world in 6 days because that was the perfect number.

The Greek mathematicians had regarded as perfect that number which equals the sum of its divisors that are smaller than itself. Such a number is neither 3 nor 7 nor 10, but 6, for 1 + 2 + 3 = 6.

But there are more numbers that show this property, such as 28, which = 1 + 2 + 4 + 7 + 14. It became customary to call such numbers "perfect." Euclid gave a formula for (even) "perfect" numbers:
Np = 2p−1 (2p − 1)
where p and 2p − 1 are prime numbers.

Euclid had listed the first four perfect numbers: 6; 28; 496; and 8128. A manuscript of 1456 gave the fifth perfect number: 33,550,336. Gradually mathematicians found further perfect numbers (which are very rare). In 1652 the Polish polymath Jan Brożek noted that there was no perfect number between 104 and 107.

Despite over 2,000 years of study, it still is not known whether there exist infinitely many perfect numbers; or whether there are any odd ones.

Today the term "perfect number" is merely historic in nature, used for the sake of tradition. These peculiar numbers had received the name on account of their analogy to the construction of man, who was held to be nature's most perfect creation, and above all on account of their own peculiar regularity. Thus, they had been so named on the same grounds as perfect objects in nature, and perfectly proportioned edifices and statues created by man; the numbers had come to be called "perfect" in order to emphasize their special regularity.

The Greek mathematicians had named these numbers "perfect" in the same sense in which philosophers and artists used the word. Jamblich (In Nicomachi arithmeticam, Leipzig, 1894) states that the Pythagoreans had called the number 6 "marriage", "health", and "beauty", on account of the harmony and accord of that number.

The perfect numbers early on came to be treated as the measure of other numbers: those in which the sum of the divisors is greater than the number itself, as in 12, have — since as early as Theon of Smyrna, ca. 130 A.D. — been called "redundant", "more than perfect" (plus quam perfecti), or "abundant numbers", and those the sum of whose divisors is smaller, as in 8, have been called "deficient numbers" (deficientes).

As of 7 December 2018, 51 perfect numbers had been identified.

Physics and chemistry

A variety of physical and chemical concepts include, in their names, the word "perfect."

Physicists designate as a perfectly rigid body, one that "is not deformed by forces applied to it", in full awareness that this is a fictitious body, that no such body exists in nature. The concept is an ideal construct.

A perfectly plastic body is one that is deformed infinitely at a constant load corresponding to the body's limit of plasticity: this is a physical model, not a body observed in nature.

A perfectly black body would be one that absorbed completely, radiation falling upon it — that is, a body with a coefficient of absorption equal to unity.

A crystal is perfect when its physically equivalent walls are equally developed; it has a perfect structure when it answers the requirements of spatial symmetry and is free of structural defects, dislocation, lacunae and other flaws.

A perfect fluid is one that is incompressible and non-viscous — this, again, is an ideal fluid that does not exist in nature.

A perfect gas is one whose molecules do not interact with each other and which have no volume of their own.  Such a gas is fictitious, just as are perfectly solid, perfectly rigid, perfectly plastic and perfectly black bodies. They are termed "perfect" in the strict (non-metaphorical) sense of the word. These are all concepts that are necessary in physics, insofar as they are limiting, ideal, fictitious — insofar as they set the extreme which nature may at the most approach.

In a looser sense, real things are called "perfect" if they approximate perfection more or less closely, though they be not, strictly speaking, perfect.

The relation of these perfect bodies to real bodies may be illustrated by the relation of a perfect gas to a real one. The equation of state of a perfect gas is a first approximation to a quantum equation of state that results from statistical physics. Thus, the equation of state of a real gas within classical limits assumes the form of the equation of state of a perfect gas. That is, the equation of state of a perfect gas describes an ideal gas (comprising points, that is, dimensionless molecules that do not act upon one another).

The perfect gas equation arose from the work of Robert Boyle, Edme Mariotte and Joseph Louis Gay-Lussac, who, in studying the properties of real gases, found formulas applicable not to these but to an ideal, perfect gas.

Ethics

The ethical question of perfection concerns not whether man is perfect, but whether he should be. And if he should be, then how is this to be attained?

Plato seldom actually used the term "perfection", but the concept of "good", central to his philosophy, was tantamount to "perfection". He believed that approximation to the idea of perfection makes people perfect.

Soon after, the Stoics introduced the concept of perfection into ethics expressly, describing it as harmony — with nature, reason, man himself. They held that such harmony—such perfection—was attainable for anyone.

Plato and the Stoics had made perfection a philosophical watchword. Soon it would be transformed, in Christianity, into a religious one.

The Christian doctrine of perfection is in the Gospels as well as elsewhere in the Bible. Matthew 5:48 enjoins: "Be ye therefore perfect, even as your Father which is in heaven is perfect." Early Christian writings, especially Paul's, are replete with calls to perfection. Many of these are collected in a discourse by St. Augustine, De perfectione iustitiae hominis. They begin already with the Old Testament: "Thou shalt be perfect with the Lord thy God." (Deuteronomy 18:13.) Elsewhere, synonyms for "perfection" are "undefiled", "without rebuke", "without blemish", "blameless", "holy", "righteous", "unblamable", "unreprovable".

Augustine explains that not only that man is properly termed perfect and without blemish who is already perfect, but also he who strives unreservedly after perfection. This is a broader concept, of approximate perfection, resembling that used in the exact sciences. The first ancient and Christian perfection was not very remote from modern self-perfection. St. Ambrose in fact wrote about degrees of perfection ("gradus piae perfectionis").

Along with the idea of perfection, Holy Scripture conveyed doubt as to whether perfection was attainable for man. According to 1 John 1:8, "If we say that we have no sin, we deceive ourselves, and the truth is not in us." Similarly Jesus said in Matthew 19:17: "And he said unto him, Why callest thou me good? there is none good but one, that is, God..."; while Jesus does not deny that he himself is good, he does call into question the idea that anyone but God can even be good, let alone perfect. Thus St. Jerome wrote: "Perfectio vera in coelestibus" — true perfection is to be found only in heaven.

As early as the 5th century CE, two distinct views on perfection had arisen within the Church: that it was attainable by man on earth by his own powers; and, that it may come to pass only by special divine grace. The first view, which was championed by Pelagius, was condemned in 417 CE; the second view, which was championed by St. Augustine, prevailed at the very beginning of the 5th century and became authoritative.

Still, the Church did not condemn the writings of the Pseudo-Areopagite, purportedly the first bishop of Athens, voicing a natural possibility for man to rise to perfection, to the contemplation of God. And so, for centuries, two views contended within the Church.

Even as, for the ancient philosophers, the essence of perfection had been harmony, so for the Gospel and the Christian theologians it was charity, or love. St. Paul wrote (Epistle to the Colossians, 3:14): "And above all these things put on charity, which is the bond of perfectness".

St. Gregory wrote that perfection will be realized only after the fulfillment of history — only "then will the world be beautiful and perfect." Still, everyone should make his own approach to perfection — to holiness. Discourses in moral theology and asceticism were generous with advice on how this was to be done.

The medieval concept of perfection and self-perfection, especially in its mature form, can be natural for modern man. As formulated by Peter Lombard, this concept implies that perfection is a result of development. And as described by Giles of Rome, perfection has not only personal sources ("personalia") but social ones ("secundum statum"). Since the individual is formed within a society, the second perfection subsumes the first, in accordance with the "order of the universe" ("ordo universi"). The social perfection is binding on man, whereas personal perfection is only becoming to him.

Theses on perfection persist within the Church to the present day. The first condition for perfection is the desire of it. Also necessary is grace — but God gives grace to those who desire perfection and strive for it. Another condition for perfection is constancy of striving and effort. Augustine says: "He who stops, regresses." And effort is necessary in things not only great but also in the smallest; the Gospel according to St. Luke says: "He that is faithful in that which is least is faithful also in much: and he that is unjust in the least is unjust also in much." An aid in approaching perfection is an awareness of God's perfection and of one's own imperfection.

The 14th century saw, with the Scotists, a shift in interest from moral to ontological perfection; the 15th century, particularly during the Italian Renaissance, a shift to artistic perfection.

The first half of the 16th century saw John Calvin's complete conditioning of man's perfection on the grace of God.

The second half of the 16th century brought the Counter-reformation, the Council of Trent, and a return of the Catholic concept; and also, heroic attempts to attain perfection through contemplation and mortification. This was the age of Ignatius Loyola and the founding of the Jesuit Order; of St. Teresa of Ávila (1515–82) and St. John of the Cross (1542–91), and the 1593 founding of the Barefoot Carmelites. This was the culminating point in the history of the Christian idea of perfection; at the same time, it was the terminal point as there soon began attempts at reforming the idea.

The first half of the 17th century saw attempts at a Catholic reform of the idea of perfection. This was the time of Cornelis Jansen (1585–1638) and of Jansenism — of a growing belief in predestination and in the impossibility of perfection without grace.

With the second half of the 17th century came a further development in the doctrine of predestination — the doctrine of "Quietism". Perfection could be reached through a passive awaiting of grace rather than by an active striving. This theory, formulated in Spain by Miguel de Molinos (ca. 1628 - 1697), spread in France, where it was espoused by Madame Guyon (1648–1717) and for a time attracted François Fénelon.

The 18th century brought a sea change to the idea of moral perfection. Faith in it remained, but it changed character from religious to secular. This secular, 18th-century perfection was a fundamental article of faith for the Enlightenment. Its central tenet was that nature was perfect; and perfect, too, was the man who lived in harmony with nature's law.

Primitive man was held to be the most perfect, for he was closest to nature. Perfection lay behind present-day man rather than before him, for civilization distanced man from perfection instead of bringing him closer to it.

A second interpretation, however, took the contrary view: civilization perfected man by bringing him closer to reason, and thereby to nature; for reason would direct life with due consideration for the laws of nature.

The former, retrospective view of perfection had antecedents in antiquity: Hesiod and Ovid had described a "golden age" that had existed at the beginning of time, and which had been succeeded by silver, copper and Iron Ages, each inferior to the previous. The renewal of this view now, after two millennia, was stimulated by European contact with the "primitive" peoples of the Americas. Jean-Jacques Rousseau was but one of many who wrote in a similar vein.

These two mid-18th-century schools of thought — one seeing perfection in nature and in the past, and the other in civilization and in the future — represented a reaction not against the idea of perfection, but against its transcendental interpretation: as, earlier, the measure of perfection had been the idea of God, so now it was the idea of nature or of civilization. It was the latter idea that ultimately gained the upper hand and passed into the 19th century as the legacy of the Enlightenment.

The idea of perfection as transcendental, fell away; only worldly perfection counted. The idea that perfection was a matter of grace, also fell by the wayside; man himself must strive for it, and if a single man could not accomplish it, then perhaps mankind could. As God had been the measure of perfection during the Middle Ages, so now man was: the measure had become smaller, more accessible. To the thinking of the 19th century, such worldly, human perfection might ultimately be attainable by everyone. And if not perfection, then improvement.  This would be the great concept of the modern age.

At the very midpoint of the 18th century, there occurred an exceptional momentary retreat from the idea of perfection.  It was in the French Encyclopédie. The entry, "Perfection" (vol. XII, 1765), discussed only technical perfection, in the sense of the matching of human products to the tasks set for them; no mention was made of ontological, moral or esthetic perfection.

Otherwise, the 18th century saw great declarations championing the future perfection of man, as in Immanuel Kant's Idee zu einer allgemeinem Geschichte (1784) and Johann Gottfried von Herder's Ideen (1784/91).

Perfection was expected to come about by a variety of means. Partly it would be by way of natural development and progress (the view espoused by David Hume) but more so by way of education (precursors of this view included John Locke, David Hartley, and the leaders of the Polish Enlightenment) and by way of overt state action (Claude Adrien Helvétius, later Jeremy Bentham); reliance was placed in cooperation among people (Charles Fourier, 1808), later in eugenics (Francis Galton, 1869). While the foundations of the faith in the future perfectibility of man changed, the faith itself persisted. It linked the people of the Enlightenment with the idealists and romantics — with Johann Gottlieb Fichte, Georg Wilhelm Friedrich Hegel, the Polish Messianists — as well as with the 19th-century Positivists and evolutionists; Herbert Spencer penned a great new declaration championing the future perfection of man.

The idea of human perfectibility had, however, become more comprehensive. Man would attain greater perfection, in the sense that he would live more rationally, healthily, happily, comfortably. But there was no adequate term for this new conception, as the term "perfection" had a moral coloring, while the new goal was more intellectual, physical and social.

In 1852, John Henry Newman, the future British cardinal, wrote that it would be well if the English language, like the Greek, had a term to express intellectual perfection, analogously to the term "health", which addresses man's physical state, and to "virtue", which speaks to his moral nature. During the 19th century, the Germans would come to call perfection, thus construed, "culture" (Kultur), and the French would call it "civilization" (civilisation).

One of the elements of perfection, in its new construction, is health, understood by the World Health Organization as "a state of complete physical and mental well-being".

Still, the burgeoning achievements of contemporary biology have not dislodged the age-old interest in moral perfection — with the important distinction, that the goal now is not so much perfection as improvement. A classic early-19th century exponent of this view was Fichte.

In the 20th and 21st centuries, the advances of science and technology appear to have been paralleled to some extent by increasingly pluralistic attitudes. The Polish philosopher Władysław Tatarkiewicz (1886–1980) has written: "To demand of someone that he strive after perfection seems equally inappropriate as to blame him for not striving after it." Such striving, he adds, "is often egocentric and yields poorer moral and social results than an outward-directed behavior based not on self-perfection but on good will and kindliness toward others".

Aesthetics
The ancient Greeks viewed perfection as a requisite for beauty and high art. The Pythagoreans held that perfection was to be found in the right proportions and in a harmonious arrangement of parts. The idea that beauty and art were characterized by perfection, was subsequently embraced by Plato, who believed that art ought to be "apt, suitable, without deviations" — in short, "perfect".

From a conviction that perfection was a single quality, the Pythagoreans, Plato and their adherents held that beauty also was a single quality; hence, for every kind of art, there was but one perfect and proper form. Plutarch stated (De Musica) that, during the early Greek age, musical harmonies that were recognized as perfect were legally binding at public performances.

Similarly, in temple architecture from the 5th century BCE, there were established orders.  There were established proportions for Doric temples, and for Ionic temples. Likewise in sculpture, for centuries, it was a matter of dogma that certain proportions of the human body were perfect and obligatory.

There was also a prevalent belief that certain shapes and proportions were in themselves perfect. Plato felt that the perfect proportion was the ratio of the side to the diagonal of a square. His authority was so great that architects and other artists continued using this proportion, even when ignorant of its source, as late as the Middle Ages.

Another early idea — one that was to be espoused by many illustrious writers and artists of various periods — found perfection in the circle and the sphere. Aristotle wrote in the Physica that the circle was "the perfect, first, most beautiful form". Cicero wrote in De Natura Deorum (On the Nature of the Gods): "Two forms are the most distinctive: of solids, the sphere... and of plane figures, the circle...  There is nothing more commensurate than these forms."

In a commentary to Aristotle's De coelo et mundo (On the Heavens and Earth), the medieval Pole, Jan of Słupcza, wrote: "The most perfect body ought to have the most perfect form, and such [a body] is heaven, while the most perfect form is the round form, for nothing can be added to it." In the famous illustrated Les très riches heures du duc de Berry, paradise is depicted as contained within an ideal sphere.

The Renaissance architect Sebastiano Serlio (1475–1554) stated: "the round form is the most perfect of all."

The most excellent of 16th-century architects, Andrea Palladio, held that "the most perfect and most excellent" form was "the round form, since of all forms it is the simplest, the most uniform, the strongest, the most capacious" and "is the most suitable for rendering the unity, infinity, uniformity and righteousness of God". This was the same thought as in Jan of Słupcza and in Serlio, and it was one of uncommon durability.

The Middle Ages — Romanesque and Gothic alike — had been quite taken with the idea of perfection. But a true explosion of the imperative for perfection came with the Renaissance.

Renaissance aesthetics placed less emphasis than had classical aesthetics on the unity of things perfect. Baldassare Castiglione, in his Courtier, wrote, of Leonardo, Andrea Mantegna, Raphael, Michelangelo and Giorgione, that "each of them is unlike the others, but each is the most perfect [perfectissimus] in his style."

The great architect and polymath Leone Battista Alberti wrote (De architectura) that "the art of building... in Italy [had] achieved perfect maturity", that the Romans had "created such a perfect art of building that there was in it nothing mysterious, hidden or unclear." This was yet another formulation of the concept of perfection.

Daniele Barbaro, in his 1567 translation of Vitruvius, classically defined perfection as "that which lacks nothing and to which nothing can be added".

The Renaissance showed a marked concern with preeminence in perfection. Leonardo concluded that the most perfect of the arts was painting. In 1546 Benedetto Varchi compared great masters in the arts. Others compared art and science, art and nature, and perfection in the arts of the ancients with that in the modern masters. The 16th century saw comparisons of their music, the 17th — of their visual arts and especially of their poetry. These comparisons construed perfection fairly loosely; the concept was treated more strictly by architects.

The Renaissance distinguished a variety of properties to perfection. It was variously held to be:
 an objective property (Petrarch, who opposed perfection to other esthetic qualities such as grace);
 specific to art rather than to nature (Vasari);
 a rare property (Alberti felt that not even Greek architecture had attained perfection);
 a property of the whole work rather than of its parts (Alberti);
 a conjunction of many values (Lodovico Dolce thought Raphael perfect because Raphael had manifold talent, as opposed to the one-sided Michelangelo);
 something that required not merely talent but art, that is, skill (Vasari);
 not the sole value in a work of art (Vasari differentiated perfection from grace; Renaissance Platonists such as Ficino viewed perfection as a divine attribute).

In the eclectic view of the late Renaissance, perfection in a work would require uniting the talents of many artists. Paolo Pino held that only that painter would be perfect who combined the talents of Titian and Michelangelo.

The concept of perfection was harder to apply to Renaissance literature but became so common — often, linked to "eccelente" — as to become banal. Its frequent application brought about its relativization and even subjectivization.

Beginning with Serlio and Palladio, perfection in art had become less important, less definite, less objective. The striving for perfection no longer had the importance for men of letters that it did for the great architects. But the 17th century still revered perfection, as shown by the appearance of that word in book titles: De perfecta poesi by the Polish poet Maciej Kazimierz Sarbiewski (1595–1640); Le peintre parfait (1767 by André Félibien; and Idée de la perfection de la peinture (1662) by Fréart de Chambray.

Sarbiewski offered several theses: poetry not only imitates things perfectissime ("most perfectly"), but imitates them as they ought perfectissime to be in nature; perfect art is recognized by its agreement with nature, as well as its universality; art is the more perfect, the nobler (nobilior) its manner of representing things; it is the more perfect, the more truths it contains; perfection has various degrees — it is higher in poetry than in prose.

In classicism, especially in French 17th-century classicism, from an ideal attainable by few, perfection became an obligation for every author. And inasmuch as the criterion of perfection had been lowered, "perfection" now meant only correctness. In the ensuing devaluation, it was not enough that art be perfecta, it should be perfectissima.

Perfection, formerly the supreme characterization for a work of art, now became but one of many positive characterizations. Cesare Ripa, in his Iconologia (published 1593, but typical for the 17th century), presented perfezione as a concept of equal status with grace (grazia), prettiness (venustà) and beauty (bellezza).

Leibniz's pupil, Christian Wolff, in his Psychology, wrote that beauty consists in perfection, and that this was why beauty was a source of pleasure.  No such general esthetic theory, explicitly naming perfection, had ever been formulated by any of its devotees from Plato to Palladio.

Wolff's theory of beauty-as-perfection was developed by the school's chief aesthetician, Alexander Gottlieb Baumgarten. This tradition remained active in Germany as late as Gotthold Ephraim Lessing, who considered both beauty and sublimity to be ideas of perfection; when unity prevailed, beauty emerged; when plurality — sublimity.

In the latter part of the 18th century, Immanuel Kant wrote much in his Critique of Judgment about perfection — inner and outer, objective and subjective, qualitative and quantitative, perceived clearly and obscurely, the perfection of nature and that of art. Nevertheless, in aesthetics Kant found that "The judgment of taste [i.e., aesthetic judgment] is entirely independent of the concept of perfection" — that is, beauty was something different from perfection.

Earlier in the 18th century, France's leading aesthetician, Denis Diderot, had questioned whether perfection was a more comprehensible idea than beauty. Jean-Jacques Rousseau had treated perfection as an unreal concept, and wrote Jean le Rond d'Alembert, "Let us not seek the chimera of perfection, but that which is the best possible."

In England, in 1757, the important aesthetician Edmund Burke denied that perfection was the cause of beauty. Quite the contrary, he argued that beauty nearly always involved an element of imperfection; for example, women, in order to heighten their attractiveness, emphasized their weakness and frailty, which is to say, their imperfection.

The 18th century was the last for which perfection was a principal concept in aesthetics. In the 19th century, perfection survived only vestigially as a general expression of approval. Alfred de Musset held that "Perfection is no more attainable for us than is infinity. One ought not to seek it anywhere: not in love, nor beauty, nor happiness, nor virtue; but one should love it, in order to be virtuous, beautiful and happy, insofar as that is possible for man."

In the 20th century, Paul Valéry wrote: "To strive for perfection, to devote endless time to a work, to set oneself—like Goethe—an unattainable goal, are all intents that are precluded by the pattern of modern life."

The dismissal of the question concerning whether artists can achieve perfection, still left the question: Do artists want to achieve it? Is that their actual goal? Some artists, schools and epochs have aimed for perfection. Others have nurtured other goals: pluralism, novelty, powerful sensations, faithfulness to truth, self-expression and expression of the world, creativity and originality — all of which may roughly be summarized as "expression."

There have been ages of perfection, and ages of expression. The arts of ancient Greece, the Renaissance and neoclassicism were arts of perfection. In the mannerist, baroque and romantic periods, expression has prevailed.

Ontology and theology
The Greek philosopher Anaximander described the world as "endless" (apeiron), Xenophanes — as "the greatest" (megistos).  But while they ascribed great qualities to the world, they did not regard it as perfect.

Only Parmenides seems to have considered existence to be "tetelesmenon" ("finished"); and Melissos, his successor in the Eleatic school, said that existence "was entirely" ("pan esti"). Thus both saw perfection in existence; true existence was one, constant, immutable.  Moreover, Parmenides thought the world to be finite, limited in all directions, and like a sphere — which was a mark of its perfection.

Parmenides' view was embraced to some extent by Plato. He thought that the world was the work of a good Demiurge, and that this was why order and harmony prevailed in the world.  The world was the best, the most beautiful, perfect. It had a perfect shape (spherical) and a perfect motion (circular).

But Plato said nothing about the Demiurge architect-of-the-world himself being perfect. And understandably so, for perfection implied finitude, limits; whereas it was the world, not its creator, that had limits. A similar view was held by Aristotle: the world could be perfect, but God could not.

Only the pantheist Stoics held the divinity to be perfect — precisely because they identified it with the world. Cicero wrote in De natura deorum (On the Nature of the Gods) that the world "encompasses... within itself all beings... And what could be more nonsensical than denying perfection to an all-embracing being...  Besides the world, there is no thing that does not lack something and that is harmonious, perfect and finished in every respect..."

At a certain moment, Greek philosophy became bound up with the religion of the Christians: the abstract concept of first cause became linked with the religious concept of God; the primum movens became identified with the Creator, the absolute with the divine Person. Features of an absolute existence were discovered in the Person of the Creator: He was immutable, timeless. And absolute existence took on the attributes of a person: it was good, omnipotent, omnipresent. Christian theology united the features of the first cause in Aristotle's Metaphysics with those of the Creator in the Book of Genesis. But the attributes of God did not include perfection, for a perfect being must be finite; only of such a being might one say that it lacked nothing.

There was another reason for the denial, to God, of perfection — in a branch of Christian theology that was under the influence of Plotinus. In this view, the absolute from which the world derived could not be grasped in terms of human concepts, even the most general and transcendent. Not only was that absolute not matter, it was not spirit either, nor idea; it was superior to these. It exceeded any description or praise; it was incomprehensible and ineffable; it was beyond all that we may imagine — including perfection.

Medieval Christian philosophy held that the concept of perfection might describe Creation, but was not appropriate to describe God. Saint Thomas Aquinas, indicating that he was following Aristotle, defined a perfect thing as one that "possesses that of which, by its nature, it is capable." Also (Summa Theologica): "That is perfect, which lacks nothing of the perfection proper to it." Thus there were, in the world, things perfect and imperfect, more perfect and less perfect. God permitted imperfections in Creation when they were necessary for the good of the whole.  And for man it was natural to go by degrees from imperfection to perfection.

Duns Scotus understood perfection still more simply and mundanely: "Perfection is that which it is better to have than not to have." It was not an attribute of God but a property of creation: all things partook of it to a greater or lesser degree. A thing's perfection depended on what sort of perfection it was eligible for. In general, that was perfect which had attained the fullness of the qualities possible for it.  Hence "whole" and "perfect" meant more or less the same ("totum et perfectum sunt quasi idem").

This was a teleological concept, for it implied an end (goal or purpose). God created things that served certain purposes, created even those purposes, but He himself did not serve any purpose.  Since God was not finite, He could not be called perfect: for the concept of perfection served to describe finite things. Perfection was not a theological concept, but an ontological one, because it was a feature, in some degree, of every being. The 9th-century thinker Paschasius Radbertus wrote: "Everything is the more perfect, the more it resembles God." Still, this did not imply that God himself was perfect.

The concept of perfection, as an attribute of God, entered theology only in modern times, through René Descartes — and in the plural, as the "perfections" of God.

After Descartes, the concept of perfection as a principal concept in philosophy was upheld by other great 17th-century thinkers. In Benedict Spinoza's philosophy, however, there was no personal God, and perfection became a property of — even a synonym for — the existence of reality (that is, for the essence of things).

Leibniz wrote: "As M. Descartes states, existence itself is perfection." Leibniz added: "Perfection, I call any simple quality, if it is positive and absolute, such that, if it expresses something, it does so without limits."

At the same time, Leibniz also construed perfection, in his Monadology, in an utterly different way: "Only that is perfect which possesses no limits, that is, only God."  This concept would last out the entire 17th century.  Subsequently, Immanuel Kant would describe perfection as "omnitudo realitatis" ("the omnitude of reality").  Thus perfection, which during the Middle Ages could be a property of any individual being, in 17th-century philosophy became as well, and indeed preeminently, a property of God.

Leibniz's pupil and successor, Christian Wolff, took up this concept of perfection — but with a difference. Wolff ascribed perfection not to being as a whole, but once again to its individual constituents. He gave, as examples, an eye that sees faultlessly, and a watch that runs faultlessly. He also distinguished variants — perfectio simplex and composita, primaria and secundaria — and differentiated the magnitude of perfection (magnitudo perfectionis).

Wolff's pupil, Alexander Gottlieb Baumgarten, derived perfection from rules, but anticipated their collisions (regularum collisio) leading to exceptions (exceptio) and limiting the perfection of things. Baumgarten distinguished perfection simplex and composita, interna and externa, transcendentalis and accidentalis; and, positing so broad a construction, he arrived at the conclusion that "everything is perfect".

In short, Wolff and his pupils had returned to the ontological concept of perfection that the Scholastics had used. The theological concept of perfection had lived only from Descartes to Leibniz, in the 17th century.

Thanks to Wolff's school, the concept of perfection lasted in Germany through the 18th century. In other western countries, however, especially France and Britain, in that century the concept of perfection was already in decline. It was ignored by the French Grande Encyclopédie.

The history of the concept of perfection had undergone great evolutions — from "Nothing in the world is perfect", to "Everything is perfect"; and from "Perfection is not an attribute of God", to "Perfection is an attribute of God."

With Christian Wolff's school, every thing had become perfect. This was a singular moment in the history of the ontological concept of perfection; and soon thereafter, that history came to an end.

Many concepts
The foregoing discussion shows that the term "perfection" has been used to designate a variety of concepts:
 The word "perfection" has a special meaning in mathematics, where it gives a proper name to certain numbers that demonstrate uncommon properties.
 In physics and chemistry, "perfection" designates a model — a conceptual construct for bodies that in reality do not precisely correspond to the model.
 Elsewhere the term "perfection" is used consistently with the word's etymology ("perfect" = "finished"). That is perfect which lacks nothing. This is how the term has been used in ontology (a perfect being), ethics (a perfect life) and medicine (perfect health). In these fields, the concept is understood variously as ideal model or as actual approximation to the model.
 Also called "perfect" is that which completely achieves its purpose. Christian Wolff gave examples from biology (perfect vision) and technology (a clock that runs neither slow nor fast).  Here "perfection" is less fictitious model than actual approximation to the model.
 That is "perfect," which completely fulfills its functions. In social discourse, one speaks of a perfect artist, engineer or carpenter. The term is used similarly in art criticism, when speaking of perfect technique or of the perfect likeness of a portrait. Here again, "perfection" is either ideal model or approximate realization of the model.
 In aesthetics and art theory, perfection is ascribed to what is fully harmonious — to what is constructed in accordance with a single principle (e.g., the Parthenon, the Odyssey).
In business and manufacturing, perfection is one of the principles underlying lean thinking.
Except for the first, mathematical sense, all these concepts of "perfection" show a kinship and oscillate between ideal and approximation.

However, the expression "perfect" is also used colloquially as a superlative ("perfect idiot," "perfect scoundrel," "perfect storm"). Here perfectum is confused with excellens of an approving, admiring or condemnatory kind.

Perfection has also been construed as that which is the best. In theology, when Descartes and Leibniz termed God "perfect," they had in mind something other than model; than that which lacks nothing; than that achieves its purpose; than that fulfills its functions; or than that is harmonious.

See also
 Christian perfection
 Perfect competition
 Perfect fifth
 Perfect flower (bisexual flower)
 Perfect fourth
 Perfectionism
 Perfection (law)
 Three perfections (Chinese art)

Notes

References
 Władysław Tatarkiewicz, O doskonałości (On Perfection), Warsaw, Państwowe Wydawnictwo Naukowe, 1976.
 An English translation of Tatarkiewicz's book (On Perfection), by Christopher Kasparek, was serialized in Dialectics and Humanism:  the Polish Philosophical Quarterly, vol. VI, no. 4 (autumn 1979), pp. 5–10; vol. VII, no. 1 (winter 1980), pp. 77–80; vol. VII, no. 2 (spring 1980), pp. 137–39; vol. VII, no. 3 (summer 1980), pp. 117–24; vol. VII, no. 4 (autumn 1980), pp. 145–53; vol. VIII, no. 1 (winter 1981), pp. 187–92; and vol. VIII, no. 2 (spring 1981), pp. 11–12.
 Kasparek's translation has subsequently also appeared in the book: Władysław Tatarkiewicz, On Perfection, Warsaw University Press, Center of Universalism, 1992, pp. 9–51.  The book is a collection of papers by and about the late Professor Tatarkiewicz.

External links

Axiology
Concepts in aesthetics